Chongshin University is a Christian university in Seoul, South Korea.  It has deep historical ties to conservative Presbyterianism, reformed theology, and belongs to the Presbyterian Church in Korea (HapDong).  The current president is Jae Seo Lee.

Academics
Undergraduate education is provided through eight departments: Social Work, Child Studies, Church Music, Early Childhood Education, History Education, English Education, Christian Education, and Theology.  Postgraduate education is divided between the seminary and the graduate schools.  The main graduate school offers degrees of Master of Theology (Th.M.), Master of Arts (M.A.), Master of Music (M.M.), Doctor of Theology (Th.D.) and Doctor of Philosophy (Ph.D.).  In addition, there are separate graduate schools of Education, Mission, and Social Work.

History
The school was founded as a seminary in 1901 by the Korean Presbyterian General Assembly. It was located in Pyongyang at the time, and known as Pyongyang Theological Seminary (평양 신학교). The first president was an American missionary by the name of Samuel Austin Moffett. The school was forced to close by the Japanese occupation government in 1938. It was reopened in 1948, now located in Seoul. A four-year college was created in 1969. The seminary became an accredited graduate school in 1978. It became a university in 1995.

Criticism: Problems with Subway Station
Before the construction of Seoul Subway Line 7, Isu Station's name was officially Chongshin University Station. However, after the construction of Line 7, Seoul Metro changed the name of the station to Isu Station and Namseong Station became Namseong (Chongshin University) station because Namseong station is especially close by Chongshin University. But the university sued Seoul Metro because the university wanted to express their school name to transfer station (It means Isu station) to publicize their university. Although the university had lost their suit, the decision was reverted because of the university's violent protest. So Isu station has different station names by subway route, "Chongshin University (Isu) station" (Line 4) and "Isu station" (Line 7).

See also
List of colleges and universities in South Korea
Education in South Korea
Isu Station - also called Chongshin University Station

References

Further reading

External links
Official school website, in Korean
Official school website, in English

Universities and colleges in Seoul
Private universities and colleges in South Korea
Educational institutions established in 1901
Presbyterian universities and colleges
1901 establishments in Korea